The COBRA RUGBY CLUB is a prominent rugby club in Malaysia under the Selangor Rugby Union and Malaysia Rugby Union.  Over the years COBRA has produced many outstanding rugby players at the national and state level. Members of COBRA are also active and well represented in the Malaysian Rugby Union, Selangor Rugby Union and the Malaysian Rugby Referees' Society.

It was originally known as the Combined Old Boys Rugby Association (COBRA).

History
COBRA was formed on 8 June 1967 in Petaling Jaya, Malaysia.
The main objective of its formation was to facilitate and encourage young Malaysians to continue playing rugby after completing school.

Teams

COBRA fields six rugby teams: 
 COBRA Blacks (1st XV)
 COBRA Stings (2nd XV)
 COBRA Development (Under 19s)
 COBRA Venom (Ladies)
 COBRATS (Junior Section Ages 5–16)
 COBRA Legends (Veterans aged 35 and above)

The COBRA Blacks, Stings & Development teams train every Tuesday and Friday.

The COBRA Venom team trains every Wednesday & Friday.

The COBRATS section train every Sunday.

All trainings are located at the Padang Astaka which is located adjacent to the clubhouse.

COBRA's 15-a-side season starts from January to April yearly.  Following that, the club participates in 7 a-side and 10 a-side tournaments organized by the local Unions and several tournaments abroad.

The club currently has approximately 200 active members.

Club Achievements

2012
 The Malaysia Rugby Union Super League (MRSL) – Champion (15-a-side)

2011
 The Malaysia Rugby Union Ten-a-side Tournament – Champion (10-a-side)
 The Malaysia Rugby Union Super League (MRSL) – Champion (15-a-side)
 Negeri Sembilan Royal 7s – Champion (7-a-side)
 Putrajaya 7s – Champion (7-a-side)

For the year 2011, 7 players from COBRA were represented in the Malaysian rugby team.

2010
 The Malaysia Rugby Union National Super League (15s) – Runner-up

Past Presidents and Current
The club's current president is Mr Boon Hoon Chee who succeeded Y.Bhg. Tan Sri Dato' Krishnan Tan who was the club's president for over a decade and played an instrumental part in developing and building its solid foundation.

 1967–1970 Dr Hui Weng Choon
 1971 Mohd Asfraff
 1972 Kim Tai Swee Leng
 1973–1974 Hussein Yusoff
 1975 S.Sinnappa
 1976–1980 Dr Chan Onn Leng
 1981–1983 Gee Boon Kee
 1984 Benny K.M. Yeoh
 1985 Ow Koon Chai
 1986 Mohd Zain Yusoff
 1988 Mohd Zain Yusoff / Dennis Pestana
 1989 Safaruddin Mohd
 1990–1994 Tan Sri Dato' Seri Megat Najmuddin Megat Khas
 1995–2009 Tan Sri Dato' Krishnan Tan Boon Seng
 2010 Boon Hoon Chee
 2012 –          Lt. Col (Retd) Tommy Pereira

Clubhouse
The COBRA Clubhouse is situated at Lorong Utara, along Jalan Utara in Petaling Jaya, Selangor.  Through the initiatives of its members, the COBRA Clubhouse was constructed in 1985.

In 2002, the Clubhouse underwent extensive renovation to cater to growing needs of members. COBRA is the first rugby club in Malaysia with its OWN Clubhouse.

Home of the 10s
COBRA is the home of 10-a-side rugby or better known as rugby tens. COBRA introduced the world's first rugby tens tournament in 1967 and in 1992 the tournament went international with participation from top clubs and Unions from around the world.  The tournament, the COBRA Rugby Tens, is usually organised on an annual basis at the Majlis Perbadaran Petaling Jaya (MBPJ) Stadium.

Awards and recognitions

National Sports Leadership Award
In 1996, COBRA was awarded the National Sports Leadership Award by the National Sports Council of Malaysia for their contribution towards the promotion and development of rugby in Malaysia.

International Olympic Council Diploma
In 2002, COBRA was awarded the IOC Diploma by the International Olympic Council for its contribution to sports.

References

External links
 http://www.cobrarugby.com

Malaysian rugby union clubs
Rugby clubs established in 1967
1967 establishments in Malaysia
History of rugby union